Bharti Kashyap is an Indian ophthalmologist and social worker. She was honoured with Nari Shakti Puraskar in 2017 and is a five-time recipient of the National IMA for the welfare of the underprivileged section of social sciences.

Personal life
Kashyap was born on May 15, 1967. She studied MBBS, MS (Ophthalmology) and Fellow in Cornea. She married Birendra Prasad Kashyap who established Kashyap Memorial Eye Hospital in Ranchi, Jharkhand.

Career 
Kashyap worked extensively for the education of children suffering from visual impairment such as detective cataract, refractive error, etc  by providing free treatment. She began social work in 1995, after discovering the increasing incidence of blindness in Jharkhand children, causing high dropout rates. She conducted a sample eye screening of some 10,000 children enrolled in state run schools at Ramgarh. She organised free eye camps to address the main causes of avoidable blindness.

She completed eye screening of more than 20 lakh children enrolled in state run schools of the state. She expanded to target underprivileged people, primitive tribes, victims of human trafficking, newspaper hawkers, diabetics, old age home residents, slum dwellers, and mentally disturbed people, to sportswomen and truck drivers. Free eye camps were organised in every block and district of Jharkhand with Kashyap Memorial Eye Bank, the charitable trust that she founded. The most noticeable impact was the return of children to school after receiving free eye glasses and free phaco cataract surgery at charitable wing- Kashyap Memorial Eye Bank.

In 2015, as Chairperson, Women Doctors’ Wing Indian Medical Association, she launched the first major offensive in Jharkhand against cervical cancer, the number one killer of women, by organising a series of Mega Women Health Camps focussing on Cervical Cancer Detection and Colposcopy Guided Cryo Treatment at the camp site throughout rural Jharkhand and in State run Sadar Hospitals. Joining hands with the state health department, she helped rope in onco-gynaecologists from Kolkata and New Delhi to provide training to gynaecologists working with state health services on early detection and treatment of cervical precancer.
 
Her efforts, the first in Jharkhand, brought quality health care to women in rural areas, saving thousands from cervical cancer.

References

External links 
 

1967 births
Living people
Indian ophthalmologists
Nari Shakti Puraskar winners
Women ophthalmologists
Place of birth missing (living people)